The 2013 King George VI and Queen Elizabeth Stakes was a horse race held at Ascot Racecourse on Saturday 27 July 2013. It was the 63rd King George VI and Queen Elizabeth Stakes.

The winner was Christoph Berglar's Novellist, a four-year-old bay colt trained in Germany by Andrea Wohler and ridden by Johnny Murtagh. Novellist's victory was the fourth in the race for Murtagh and the first for his trainer and owner. It was the second consecutive success for a German-trained horse following the victory of Danedream in 2012.

Novellist was an established international performer, having won the Gran Premio di Milano in Italy in October 2012 and the Grand Prix de Saint-Cloud in France in June 2013. In the 2013 King George VI and Queen Elizabeth Stakes, Novellist, starting at odds of 13/2, took the lead a quarter of a mile from a finish and drew clear in the closing stages and won by five lengths from the Irish colt Trading Leather. The British colt Hillstar finished third ahead of the French-trained favourite Cirrus des Aigles.

This was the first running of the race to be shown on Channel 4; the BBC had shown the race every year from 1951 to 2012.

Race details
 Sponsor: Betfair
 Purse: £1,047,641; First prize: £603,961
 Surface: Turf
 Going: Good to Firm
 Distance: 12 furlongs
 Number of runners: 8
 Winner's time: 2:24.60

Full result

 Abbreviations: nse = nose; nk = neck; shd = head; hd = head

Winner's details
Further details of the winner, Novellist
 Sex: Colt
 Foaled: 10 March 2009
 Country: Ireland
 Sire: Monsun; Dam: Night Lagoon (Lagunas)
 Owner: Christoph Berglar
 Breeder: Christoph Berglar

Subsequent breeding careers
Leading progeny of participants in the 2013 King George VI and Queen Elizabeth Stakes.
Novellist (1st) - Last Draft (1st Keisei Hai 2019)Universal (5th) - Minor flat and jumps winnersVery Nice Name (7th) - Minor flat runnersHillstar (3rd) - Progeny yet to race

References

King George
 2013
King George VI and Queen Elizabeth Stakes
King George VI and Queen Elizabeth Stakes
2010s in Berkshire